387th Explosive Ordnance Disposal Company is part of the 79th Troop Command, Massachusetts Army National Guard, United States Army National Guard.

Location 
The 387th EOD Company is located on Camp Edwards, Otis Air National Guard Base, Cape Cod, Massachusetts.

Description of Duties 
EOD Soldiers are the Army's "preeminent tactical and technical explosives experts. They are warriors who are properly trained, equipped and integrated to attack, defeat and exploit unexploded ordnance, improvised explosive devices and weapons of mass destruction."

References

Explosive ordnance disposal units and formations
Military units and formations in Massachusetts